{{Infobox film
| name           = Reagan
| image          = Reagan poster.jpg
| caption        = Teaser poster
| director       = Sean McNamara
| producer       = Mark Joseph
| based_on       = {{Plainlist|
 {{Based on|God and Ronald Reagan: A Spiritual Life|Paul Kengor}}
 
}}
| screenplay     = Howard KlausnerJonas McCord
| story          = 
| starring       = 
| narrator       = 
| music          = 
| cinematography = Christian Sebaldt
| editing        = Clayton Woodhull
| studio         = MJM Entertainment
| distributor    = Rawhide Pictures
| released       = 
| country        = United States
| language       = English
| budget         = 
| gross          = 
}}Reagan is an upcoming biographical historical drama film directed by Sean McNamara and written by Howard Klausner and Jonas McCord, based on two books by Paul Kengor. The film stars Dennis Quaid as Ronald Reagan. Penelope Ann Miller, Robert Davi, Lesley-Anne Down and Jon Voight feature in supporting roles.

Principal photography on the film began on September 9, 2020, and included locations such as Guthrie, Oklahoma.

 Plot 
The film follows Ronald Reagan's life from his childhood to his years as president of the United States, told by a former KGB agent.

Cast

Dennis Quaid as Ronald Reagan
Tommy Ragen as young Ronald Reagan
David Henrie as young adult Ronald Reagan
Penelope Ann Miller as Nancy Reagan
Nick Searcy as James Baker
C. Thomas Howell as Caspar Weinberger
Kevin Dillon as Jack L. Warner
Skip Schwink as Jimmy Carter
Mena Suvari as Jane Wyman
Jon Voight as Viktor Novikov
Trevor Donovan as John Barletta
Lesley-Anne Down as Margaret Thatcher
Aleksander Krupa as Mikhail Gorbachev
Hideo Kimura as Yasuhiro Nakasone
Robert Davi as Leonid Brezhnev
Scott Stapp as Frank Sinatra
Xander Berkeley as George Shultz
Moriah Peters as Loyce Whiteman
Amanda Righetti as Nelle Reagan
Justin Chatwin as Jack Reagan
Ryan Whitney as Margaret "Mugs" Cleaver
Elya Baskin as B.E. Kertchman
Chris Massoglia as Pat Boone
Mark Moses as William P. Clark Jr.
Dan Lauria as Tip O'Neill
Darci Lynne

Production
Klausner and McCord penned the script, based on two books by Paul Kengor: God and Ronald Reagan: A Spiritual Life and The Crusader: Ronald Reagan and the Fall of Communism''. Kengor described the script's development as faithful to both his books and history.

In 2012, Voight was in discussions to portray Viktor Novikov, whom Kengor said "is actually a character based on a number of KGB agents and Soviet analysts who we now know were tasked with keeping tabs on Ronald Reagan for many years".

Principal photography began on September 9, 2020. Filming locations included Guthrie, Oklahoma. It was announced on October 22, 2020, that filming had shut down after several crew members tested positive for COVID-19 in the midst of the ongoing pandemic. Filming resumed on November 5, 2020.

The film was originally due to be released in 2021, but now will be released in early 2023.

See also
 Cultural depictions of Ronald Reagan

References

External links

2020s biographical drama films
2020s historical drama films
American biographical drama films
American films based on actual events
American political drama films
Cold War films
Drama films based on actual events
Upcoming English-language films
Upcoming films
Film productions suspended due to the COVID-19 pandemic
Films about presidents of the United States
Films based on biographies
Films directed by Sean McNamara
Films set in the 1940s
Films set in the 1950s
Films set in the 1980s
Films set in Washington, D.C.
Films set in the White House
Films shot in Oklahoma
Political films based on actual events
Films about Ronald Reagan
Cultural depictions of Leonid Brezhnev
Cultural depictions of Jimmy Carter
Cultural depictions of Mikhail Gorbachev
Cultural depictions of Frank Sinatra
Cultural depictions of Margaret Thatcher
2020s English-language films
Films produced by Mark Joseph (producer)
2020s American films